Calogoniodiscus is an extinct genus of gastropods in the family Discidae.

Calogoniodiscus is also considered a subgenus of Discus.

References

External links 

 Calogoniodiscus elegans 国家自然科技资源平台NIGP古生物化石数据 (Guójiā zìrán kējì zīyuán píngtái NIGP gǔshēngwù huàshí shùjù = Paleontological Fossil Data at the National Natural Science and Technology Resource Platform) (in Chinese)

Prehistoric gastropod genera
Gastropod genera
Discidae